Keith Bently Davids (born 1968) is an American United States Navy special warfare officer with the rank of Rear Admiral. He is currently the commander of Naval Special Warfare Command since August 19, 2022. He was the commander of U.S. Special Operations Command South, United States Southern Command from 2020 to 2022. Previously, he served as director of the White House Military Office during the Presidency of Donald Trump. Earlier in his career, he was commanding officer of the Naval Special Warfare Center and SEAL Team One.

Early life and education 
Davids was born and raised in Miami, Florida. After attending private schools, he graduated from Coral Gables Senior High School in Coral Gables, Florida. Davids graduated from the United States Naval Academy in 1990. He later went on to receive a Master of Science in manpower systems analysis from the Naval Postgraduate School in 1998 and a Master of Science in National Security Strategy from the National War College in 2012.

Career 
After his commission as an Ensign in the U.S. Navy, he received orders to Basic Underwater Demolition/SEAL training (BUD/S) at Naval Amphibious Base Coronado. He graduated BUD/S class 177 in 1991. Following SEAL Tactical Training (STT) and completion of six month probationary period, he received the 1130 designator as a Naval Special Warfare Officer, entitled to wear the Special Warfare insignia also known as "SEAL Trident". 
As a Navy SEAL officer, Davids served as an assistant platoon commander and platoon commander for SEAL Team Two. Davids volunteered for assignment to Naval Special Warfare Development Group at Damneck, Virginia and completed a specialized selection and training course in 1995 where he served as element leader and squadron operations officer. Davids was promoted to Captain in September 2011.

Davids served numerous command and staff assignments including executive officer of SEAL Team Seven; aide-de-camp for Commander-in-Chief Atlantic Fleet; military aide to the President of the United States; commanding officer of SEAL Team One, deputy commander of Naval Special Warfare Group Three; director of Operations at Naval Special Warfare Command; commanding officer of Naval Special Warfare Center and commander of Special Operations Command South, USSOUTHCOM Davids was selected to serve as the director of the White House Military Office on September 6, 2017.

Awards and decorations

Personal life 
Davids and his wife, Yvette M. Davids, have twin sons, Kai and Kiernan Davids.

References

1968 births
Living people
People from Miami
Coral Gables Senior High School alumni
United States Naval Academy alumni
United States Navy SEALs personnel
Naval Postgraduate School alumni
United States Navy personnel of the War in Afghanistan (2001–2021)
National War College alumni
United States Naval Special Warfare Command
White House Military Office
Recipients of the Legion of Merit
United States Navy rear admirals
Recipients of the Defense Superior Service Medal